Jim Braun is a retired American football coach.  He served as the head football coach at Concordia University in Saint Paul, Minnesota from 1979 to 1982 and at Concordia University Chicago from 1983 to 1996, compiling a career college football coaching record of 58–101–4.

Head coaching record

References

External links
 Concordia (IL) Hall of Fame profile

Year of birth missing (living people)
Living people
American football linebackers
Concordia Cougars football coaches
Concordia Cougars football players
Concordia Golden Bears football coaches